Tasty is the eleventh rock album by British instrumental (and sometimes vocal) group The Shadows, released in 1977 through Columbia (EMI).

Track listing

Personnel
Hank Marvin – Electric and acoustic guitars
Bruce Welch – Electric and acoustic guitars
John Farrar – Electric and acoustic guitars
Brian Bennett – Drums, percussion and piano
With
Dave Richmond – Bass guitar
Alan Tarney – Bass guitar
Norrie Paramor – Orchestral accompaniment on "Return to the Alamo"

Tony Clark and Dick Plant – Engineers
 Recorded at – Abbey Road Studios, London / Music Centre, Wembley
 Back Cover Photograph – Gered Mankowitz
 Design and Artwork – Cream

References 

1977 albums
EMI Columbia Records albums
The Shadows albums
Instrumental albums